Elfa or ELFA may refer to: 

Elfa AB, Swedish electronics supplier
Elfa International, Swedish shelving company
English Ladies Football Association (ELFA), 1921–1922
Elfa Rún Kristinsdóttir (born 1985), Icelandic violinist
Elfa Secioria (1961–2012), Indonesian composer and songwriter
 (bankrupt in 1993), major Lithuanian manufacturer of tape recorders and motors for various appliances